Madhupur–Giridih–Koderma line is a -long single  broad gauge track from Madhupur town in Deoghar district to Koderma town in Koderma district via Giridih town in Giridih district of Jharkhand state. It is an extended route of Madhupur–Giridih railway line. The Koderma–Maheshmunda section falls under Dhanbad Division of East Central Railway and Giridih–Madhupur section under Asansol Division of Eastern Railway. The construction of  rail line from Koderma to Maheshmunda was done under supervision of Dhanbad Division of East Central Railway.

History 
Giridih railway station was built as a railway siding in 1871 by the British government in India (prior to the India's independence in 1947) mainly for transport of mineral reserve from the region. The contract for the railway siding was awarded in 1865 and the construction was completed in 1871. The siding is owned by Central Coalfields Limited.

A  track from Koderma to Maheshmunda was constructed. This extended the Madhupur–Giridih railway line to Koderma, effectively making it a Madhupur–Giridih–Koderma line. A new railway station was built in Giridih named as New Giridih railway station (NGRH) which leaves out the already existing Giridih railway station (GRD) on this route, also making Maheshmunda a junction station. On 16 February 2019, Eastern Railway in its press-release announced a passenger train service w.e.f. 25 February 2019 from Koderma to Madhupur via . Onward journey duration is of 4 hours and 5 minutes while the return journey duration is 4 hours and 25 minutes. Eastern Railway also announced another passenger train service w.e.f. 25 February 2019 from Koderma to Maheshmunda Junction through the same press-release. Onward journey duration is of 3 hours while the return journey duration is 3 hours and 10 minutes.

Electrification
Madhupur–Giridih–Koderma line was completely electrified in October 2020.

Further extension
There are plans from the Railways ministry to connect  with  via Madhuban, for the convenience of the Jain pilgrims visiting Shikharji. The foundation for the construction of new Parasnath–New Giridih rail line was laid in 2019. The 47 km-long railway line would incur a cost of Rs 972 crore on its construction and will have two crossing stations and a couple of halts. The cost of the project would be borne by the central and the state government in 50:50 ratio and a target has been set to complete the project by 2023.

There are other proposals as well to connect  with  via Tundi and Govindpur, and with  via Bengabad, Chakai and Sono. The first phase of the Jhajha–New Giridih rail line involves 20-km long Jhajha–Batia section, the foundation for which was laid in 2019 and which will be constructed at a cost of Rs 496 crore.

A delay of more than 30 minutes for an engine change at  will thus be avoided. The estimated cost of the linking project is Rs 281 crore.

Description
Following is the list of stations that are on – route via .

Trains
Single passenger train run five times a day between –. The train service on Madhupur–Giridih rail route started in 1871. The passenger trains are run by Eastern Railway zone. The trains run five times daily except Thursdays and four times on Thursday.

After the construction of Koderma–Maheshmunda section in 2019, new passenger trains were started on this route which are run by East Central Railway. Following are the trains running on this route via .

See also
 Indian Railways
 Giridih
 Giridih district

References

External links
 India Rail Info
 Erail

5 ft 6 in gauge railways in India
Rail transport in Jharkhand
Asansol railway division
Dhanbad railway division
Railway lines opened in 1871